Hum is a settlement in the Municipality of Brda in the Littoral region of Slovenia, on the border with Italy.

References

External links
Hum on Geopedia

Populated places in the Municipality of Brda